Saint-Siméon is a commune in the Seine-et-Marne department in the Île-de-France region in north-central France.

Demographics
Inhabitants of Saint-Siméon are called Saint-Siméonais.

In Popular Culture
Vanessa Paradis married Samuel Benchetrit in June, 2018, in the town hall-school. Vanessa Paradis has a country estate nearby, and her late father owned a small restaurant in the quiet country commune.

See also
 Communes of the Seine-et-Marne department

References

External links

 1999 Land Use, from IAURIF (Institute for Urban Planning and Development of the Paris-Île-de-France région) 
 

Communes of Seine-et-Marne